Gordon P. Walker is professor in the Department of Geography and Lancaster Environment Centre at Lancaster University.  Walker is the author of many publications on environmental justice and inequality, and community energy initiatives which involve embedding renewable energy at the local level.

See also
David Elliott (professor)
Andy Stirling
Stephen Thomas (economist)

References

External links
Lancaster University: Professor Gordon Walker
Scientists take on Brown over nuclear plans

People associated with energy
Sustainability advocates
Academics of Lancaster University
Living people
Year of birth missing (living people)